Precipitate delivery refers to childbirth after an unusually rapid labor (combined 1st stage and second stage duration in under two hours) and culminates in the rapid, spontaneous expulsion of the infant. Delivery often occurs without the benefit of asepsis.

Predisposing factors
There are common factors which may cause a woman to deliver rapidly. These factors include:
 A multipara with relaxed pelvic or perineal floor muscles may have an extremely short period of expulsion.
 A multipara with unusually strong, forceful contractions. Two to three powerful contractions may cause the baby to appear with considerable rapidity.
 Inadequate warning of imminent birth due to absence of painful sensations during labor.

Danger of precipitate delivery
There are several misfortunes associated with precipitate delivery for both the mother and the infant. They are classified as maternal and neonatal.

Maternal
Precipitate delivery may cause lacerations of the cervix, vagina, and/or perineum. Rapid descent and delivery of an infant does not allow maternal tissues adequate time to stretch and accommodate the passage of the infant.
There may be hemorrhaging originating from lacerations and/or hematomas of the cervix, vagina, or perineum. There may also be hemorrhaging from the uterus. Uterine atony may result from muscular exhaustion after unusually strong and rapid labor.
There may be infection as a result of unsterile delivery.

Neonatal
Precipitate delivery may cause intracranial hemorrhage resulting from a sudden change in pressure on the fetal head during rapid expulsion.
It may cause aspiration of amniotic fluid, if unattended at or immediately following delivery.
There may be infection as a result of unsterile delivery.

References

Childbirth